"Little Boy" is a song recorded by the German eurodance group Captain Jack. It was released in September 1996 as the fourth and final single from their album, The Mission. The song peaked at number 8 in the Netherlands, number 16 in Finland and number 27 in Germany. On the Eurochart Hot 100, "Little Boy" reached number 73.

Music video
The music video was directed by Oliver Sommer and filmed in Berlin, Germany.

Charts

Weekly charts

Year-end charts

References

1996 songs
1996 singles
Captain Jack (band) songs
Music videos directed by Oliver Sommer